is a Japanese vocational school. It opened in 1921 as the first co-educational school in Japan.

Alumni
 Hisae Imai
 Takako Irie
 Liu Chi-hsiang
 Yoko Mizuki
 Akiko Santo
 Akira Terao
Mitsu Yashima
 Guan Zilan, Chinese painter

References

External links
 

Japanese vocational colleges
Educational institutions established in 1921
1921 establishments in Japan